AUSCANNZUKUS is an abbreviation for the naval Command, Control, Communications and Computers (C4) interoperability organization involving the Anglosphere nations of Australia, Canada, New Zealand, the United Kingdom, and the United States. It is also used as security caveat in the UKUSA Community, where it is also known as "Five Eyes."

Objectives, strategies and guiding principles
The organization's vision and mission, objectives, strategies and guiding principles,
and Structure
are presented on the AUSCANNZUKUS Information Portal.

Objectives
To achieve internal sharing and understanding of Maritime C4 knowledge.
To produce products and processes to achieve Maritime C4 interoperability.
To increase external sharing and understanding of AUSCANNZUKUS.

Strategies
Establish C4 policy and standards.
Identify C4 interoperability requirements and risks.
Identify, develop and utilize new technologies.
Exchange information on national C4 capabilities, plans, and projects.
To improve national awareness of AUSCANNZUKUS.
Leverage exercises, experiments and demonstrations to deliver capability.
Inform and influence multi national defence fora.

Guiding principles
The focus of all activities is to be on the requirements of the naval warfighter.
All knowledge-sharing initiatives are to aim at providing innovative options, which are affordable to all AUSCANNZUKUS navies.
All relevant information is to be shared with appropriate joint and combined organizations.

Structure
The current AUSCANNZUKUS organization consists of the supervisory board, C4 Committee, and various other subordinate groups.

History
Early in World War II communications interoperability between Allied forces was poor. During March 1941 the first high-level proposals to formally structure combined operations between the United States and the United Kingdom were considered; these discussions were the genesis of the current Combined Communications Electronics Board (CCEB).

The origins of the AUSCANNZUKUS organization arose from dialogue between Admiral Arleigh Burke, USN, and Admiral Lord Louis Mountbatten, RN, in 1960.  Their intention was to align naval communications policies and prevent, or at least limit, any barriers to interoperability, with the imminent introduction of sophisticated new communications equipment. AUSCANNZUKUS matured to the current five-nation organization in 1980 when New Zealand became a full member.

The organization's remit has expanded over the years, and its mission now includes fostering knowledge sharing and C4 interoperability between the navies of the five nations in order to increase operational effectiveness.

Related organizations
AUSCANNZUKUS liaises closely with Washington-based management groups of the
Combined Communications Electronics Board (CCEB),
Multinational Interoperability Council (MIC), American, British, Canadian, Australian and New Zealand Armies' Interoperability Program (ABCANZ Armies),
Air and Space Interoperability Council (ASIC (Air Force))
and The Technical Cooperation Program (TTCP).

See also

 ABCANZ Armies
 Air and Space Interoperability Council (air forces)
 Allied technological cooperation during World War II
 AUKUS
 ANZUS
 CANZUK
 Combined Communications Electronics Board (communication-electronics)
 Five Eyes (intelligence)
 The Technical Cooperation Program (technology and science)
 Tizard Mission
 UKUSA Agreement (signal intelligence)

References

External links
 AUSCANNZUKUS structure

Anglosphere
International military organizations
Military technology
Military standardization